Fernando Daniel Telechea (born 6 October 1981) is a retired Argentine professional footballer who played as a forward.

Career
Telechea had youth periods with Pinta, Boca Juniors and Racing de Balcarce. He started his senior career with time in Union de Balcarce, Racing de Balcarce and Almagro Florida, prior to joining Deportivo Norte of Torneo Argentino C in 2006. Months later, he made the move to Torneo Argentino B side Villa del Parque and subsequently scored sixteen goals in twenty-six matches. In 2007, Alvarado signed Telechea. He remained for two years, featuring in fifty-five games and netting twenty-three times as the club won promotion in 2007–08 to Torneo Argentino A. June 2009 saw Telechea join Torneo Argentino A's Santamarina.

He scored eight goals in his debut season, including his first against Cipolletti on 22 November. In July 2010, Tigre in the Argentine Primera División added Telechea to their squad. He scored on his first start for Tigre, grabbing the second goal in a 2–0 victory versus Gimnasia y Esgrima. He departed Tigre at the end of the 2010–11 season following twenty appearances. He subsequently joined Primera B Nacional team Quilmes and scored eleven goals, notably four in one match against Guillermo Brown, in his opening campaign as Quilmes won promotion to the top-flight. Forty-nine apps and four goals followed over the next two seasons.

Telechea ended 2014 with a short spell with Colón in Primera B Nacional, playing a total of sixteen matches and scoring once. Telechea rejoined Santamarina, now in the second tier, for the 2015 season. On 25 April 2015, Telechea scored a hat-trick versus Chacarita Juniors. Those were three of twenty-two strikes in 2015, which led the club to the promotion play-off finals; where they were beat by Patronato. Subsequently, in January 2016, Patronato completed the signing of Telechea. His first Patronato goal arrived on his debut over San Lorenzo on 6 February. In July 2017, Telechea mutually terminated his Patronato contract.

Soon after, on 20 July, Telechea agreed to join recently-relegated Primera División club Aldosivi in Primera B Nacional for 2017–18. He netted his 100th career goal in November 2017 against Brown. On 11 December 2018, Telechea rescinded his contract with Aldosivi. Ten days later, he secured a move to ex-club Santamarina; rejoining for a third time.

Career statistics
.

Honours
Aldosivi
Primera B Nacional: 2017–18

References

External links

1981 births
Living people
People from Balcarce Partido
Argentine footballers
Association football forwards
Torneo Argentino B players
Torneo Argentino A players
Argentine Primera División players
Primera Nacional players
Club Atlético Alvarado players
Club y Biblioteca Ramón Santamarina footballers
Club Atlético Tigre footballers
Quilmes Atlético Club footballers
Club Atlético Colón footballers
Club Atlético Patronato footballers
Aldosivi footballers
Sportspeople from Buenos Aires Province